Jarandersonia is a genus of flowering plants belonging to the family Malvaceae.

It is native to Borneo.

The genus name of Jarandersonia is in honour of James Aidan Robb Anderson (1922–2004), an English forester, botanist and plant collector with the Forestry Service in Sarawak (now in Malaysia). it was first described and published in Reinwardtia Vol.5 on page 319 in 1960.

Known species
According to Kew:
Jarandersonia clemensiae 
Jarandersonia parvifolia 
Jarandersonia pentaceoides 
Jarandersonia purseglovei 
Jarandersonia rinoreoides 
Jarandersonia spinulosa 
Jarandersonia yahyantha

References

Brownlowioideae
Malvaceae genera
Plants described in 1960
Flora of Borneo